Mikkel Kallesøe Andreasen (born 20 April 1997) is a Danish professional footballer who plays as a right-back for Danish Superliga club Randers FC.

Club career

Randers FC
In the summer 2014, Kallesøe got promoted to the first team squad, at age 17, after signing a three-year professional- and full-time contract with the Randers.

On 26 October 2014, Kallesøe got his debut for Randers FC, at age 17. Kallesøe started on the bench, but replaced Kasper Fisker in the 80nd minute in a 3–0 victory against OB.

In October 2016 in a match between Randers and  Lyngby Boldklub, Kallesøe suffered a horrible concussion, which was the fifth concussion in his career. The concussion kept Kallesøe sidelined for 6 months and was close to making an end of his football career. Since this incident, Kallesøe has played with either a helmet or a special headband.

Loan to Viborg FF
On 31 August 2017, Kallesøe was loaned out to Viborg FF for the rest of 2017. Kallesøe made 12 appearances for Viborg, and despite the club expressing an interest in keeping him for longer, Kallesøe and Randers agreed on his return to the club from January 2018.

Return to Randers
Kallesøe signed a contract extension until 2023 with Randers on 4 January 2019. His deal was extended further on 21 September 2021, as he signed a five-year contract until 2016.

Honours
Randers
Danish Cup: 2020–21

References

External links
 Mikkel Kallesøe on randersfc.dk
 
 Mikkel Kallesøe on DBU

Living people
1997 births
People from Lemvig
Association football fullbacks
Danish men's footballers
Danish Superliga players
Holstebro BK players
Randers FC players
Denmark youth international footballers
Sportspeople from the Central Denmark Region